Jon A. Steinbrecher is the current commissioner of the Mid-American Conference (MAC) of the National Collegiate Athletic Association (NCAA) Division I collegiate athletic conference. He has held the position since 2009. He was previously the commissioner of the Ohio Valley Conference.

Personal life
Steinbrecher is a 1983 graduate of Valparaiso University, where he earned a Bachelor of Science degree in physical education and journalism. In 2006, he was bestowed an Alumni Achievement Award from his alma mater and in 2014 was inducted into the Valparaiso University Athletics Hall of Fame. Steinbrecher graduated with a master's degree in sports administration from Ohio University in 1984, and he was awarded the doctorate of physical education in sports administration from Indiana University in 1989.

References

External links
Mid-American Conference bio

Year of birth missing (living people)
Living people
Mid-American Conference commissioners
Ohio Valley Conference commissioners
Summit League commissioners